Lydgate may refer to:
John Lydgate (1370–1451), English monk and poet
Tertius Lydgate, a character in the novel Middlemarch by George Eliot
Lydgate, Greater Manchester, a village in Greater Manchester, England
Lydgate, Nova Scotia, a Canadian community in Shelburne
Lydgate, West Yorkshire, a village in Calderdale, England
Lydgate Junior School, in Crosspool, Sheffield, South Yorkshire, England